This is a list of non-comics media appearances of Gambit.

Television

 Gambit appears in X-Men: The Animated Series, voiced initially by Chris Potter and later by Tony Daniels. This version is a loyal member of the X-Men who feels insecure about whether his teammates trust him, a former member of the Guild of Thieves, and was previously in a romantic relationship with Bella Donna before forming one with Rogue over the course of the series.
 Gambit appears in the Spider-Man episodes "The Mutant Agenda" and "Mutant's Revenge", voiced again by Chris Potter. This version is a member of the X-Men
 Gambit makes a cameo appearance in the Fantastic Four episode "Nightmare in Green". This version is a member of the X-Men.
 Gambit appears in X-Men: Evolution, voiced by Alessandro Juliani. This version is a member of Magneto's Acolytes who slowly forms a relationship with Rogue after kidnapping her to force her to help him rescue his father, Jean-Luc, from the Rippers. As of a flash-forward depicted in the series finale, Gambit has defected to the X-Men.
 Gambit appears in Wolverine and the X-Men, voiced by Phil LaMarr. This version is a freelance thief and saboteur for hire who sports a strong Cajun accent.

Film

 James Bamford was set to make a cameo appearance as Gambit in X2, but the scene was cut. Despite this, Gambit's name appears on William Stryker's computer.
 Gambit appears in an early draft of X-Men: The Last Stand as a new student of Xavier's School for Gifted Youngsters and Iceman's rival for Rogue's affections. Before he was ultimately cut following the original producers and director being changed out, Keanu Reeves was being considered, Channing Tatum auditioned for the role, Josh Holloway was offered, but declined due to scheduling conflicts with Lost, and Gregory Helms stated that he planned to read for the part. In audio commentary accompanying the home release, Gambit was also meant to appear as a prisoner recruited into Magneto's Brotherhood of Mutants, but his role was cut.
 Remy LeBeau / Gambit appears in X-Men Origins: Wolverine, portrayed by Taylor Kitsch, though Channing Tatum was originally considered for the role. This version was held captive by William Stryker for two years, during which he received the nickname "Gambit" from the guards he consistently beat at poker and possesses the ability to charge objects with more force instead of explosive energy. Additionally, he lacks the comic book character's black and red eyes, as the producers felt it was too distracting, and was inspired by the Ultimate Marvel incarnation, who was reinterpreted as a retired thief with a Southern/Cajun accent.
 Channing Tatum was intended to portray Remy LeBeau / Gambit in a titular solo film, with development progressing over several years. In 2014, Lauren Shuler Donner stated at the world premiere of X-Men: Days of Future Past that Tatum would portray Gambit in X-Men: Apocalypse, followed by the solo film. In October 2014, Tatum revealed that the Gambit film is in development and that they were looking for a writer. In October 2014, Fox officially announced the film as Gambit, with a script from Joshua Zetumer, based on a story treatment by longtime X-Men scribe Chris Claremont. Additionally, Simon Kinberg, Donner, Tatum and Reid Carolin would co-produce the film. The film was initially scheduled to be released in October 2016, with Tatum stating that it will be an origin story. By June 2015, Rupert Wyatt signed onto the project as director. By August 2016, Tatum stated that Gambit would not be in X-Men: Apocalypse. By August 2015, Léa Seydoux had been cast to portray LeBeau's love interest and fellow mutant, Bella Donna Boudreaux. The following month, Wyatt dropped out of production due to scheduling conflicts. Kinberg stated a further month later that he hoped to start filming the following spring. The film was re-slated for an October 2016 release date, but had several delays as the studio wanted to get the script right and set a unique tone and the right voice. By July of the same year, Kinberg announced that the film's script was completed, with Doug Liman attached as director, after overseeing script re-writes, with filming slated to begin the following spring. However, by August, Liman also left production due to scheduling conflicts. Amidst further production delays and while on a press tour promoting the television series Legion, Donner confirmed that Tatum is still signed on to star in the film and is highly involved with the development process. By August 2017, the script was undergoing further rewrites, citing the successes of both Deadpool and Logan. By October, it was announced that Gore Verbinski was hired as the film's new director. Later, the working title of Gambit was revealed to be Chess. On January 11, 2018, Verbinski departed, leaving the film without a director once more. In May 2018, Kinberg stated that the final script had been completed and production will begin in the third quarter of 2018. On September 27, 2018, Kinberg revealed to IGN that the film will be a romantic comedy. The film was scheduled to be released on March 13, 2020. On March 14, 2019, due to Disney's then-pending acquisition of Fox, Wyatt stated, "now Disney have the reins so I don't know what their plans are." The movie was officially shelved in May 2019.

Video games

 Gambit appears in Spider-Man/X-Men: Arcade's Revenge.
 Gambit appears as a playable character in X-Men (1993).
 Gambit appears as a playable character in X-Men 2: Clone Wars.
 Gambit appears as a playable character in X-Men: Gamesmaster's Legacy.
 Gambit appears as a playable character in X-Men: Mojo World.
 Gambit appears as a playable character in X-Men: Mutant Apocalypse.
 Gambit makes a cameo appearance in Wolverine: Adamantium Rage.
 Gambit appears as a playable character in X-Men vs. Street Fighter, voiced again by Tony Daniels.
 Gambit appears as a playable character in Marvel vs. Capcom: Clash of Super Heroes, voiced again by Tony Daniels.
 Gambit appears as a playable character in Marvel vs. Capcom 2: New Age of Heroes, voiced again by Tony Daniels.
 Gambit appears as a playable character in X-Men: Mutant Academy, voiced again by Tony Daniels.
 Gambit appears as a playable character in X-Men: Mutant Academy 2, voiced again by Tony Daniels.
 Gambit appears as a playable character in X-Men: Next Dimension, voiced once again by Tony Daniels.
 Gambit appears as a playable character in X-Men Legends, voiced by Scott MacDonald.
 Gambit appears as a playable character in X-Men Legends II: Rise of Apocalypse, voiced again by Scott MacDonald.
 Gambit makes a non-speaking cameo appearance in Marvel: Ultimate Alliance.
 Gambit appears as a playable character in Marvel: Ultimate Alliance 2, voiced by Michael Dunn. Additionally, his Horsemen of Apocalypse form appears as an alternate skin.
 Gambit appears as a boss in the X-Men Origins: Wolverine film tie-in game, voiced by Chris Edgerly. This version sports a stronger Cajun accent than the film incarnation and employs several four-armed, blade-wielding, female mutants.
 Gambit appears as a playable character in Marvel Super Hero Squad Online, voiced again by Phil LaMarr.
 Gambit appears in X-Men: Destiny, voiced again by Phil LaMarr.
 Gambit makes a background appearance in Ultimate Marvel vs Capcom 3, voiced by Rick Pasqualone.
 Gambit appears as a playable character in Marvel: Avengers Alliance.
 Gambit appears as a playable character in Marvel Heroes voiced again by Rick Pasqualone.
 Gambit makes a non-speaking appearance in Deadpool as part of a hallucination that the titular character has. Additionally, Mister Sinister employs several explosive clones of Gambit.
 Gambit appears as a playable character in Lego Marvel Super Heroes, voiced again by Phil LaMarr.
 Gambit appears as a playable character in Marvel Puzzle Quest.
 Gambit appears as a playable character in Marvel: Future Fight.
 Gambit appears as a playable character in Marvel Ultimate Alliance 3: The Black Order, voiced again by Rick Pasqualone. He is available as part of the "Rise of the Phoenix" DLC.
 Gambit appears as a playable character in Marvel Super War.
 Gambit appears as an alternate skin in Fortnite.

Miscellaneous
 Gambit appears in the novelization for X2, by Chris Claremont.
 Gambit appears in the Chaos Engine trilogy. This version is a member of the X-Men, who escaped Doctor Doom's efforts to alter reality with the Cosmic Cube due to their being inside the Starlight Citadel. While helping the X-Men investigate what happened, Gambit is infected with a techno-virus and sacrifices himself to destroy himself and the body the team were imprisoned in. After the Red Skull gains ahold of the Cosmic Cube and creates his own ideal version of reality, the Starlight Citadel allows Gambit's soul to be reborn in the "local" version, allowing him to rejoin the X-Men until Roma retrieves enough organic material from his original body to regenerate it and place Gambit's soul back.
 Gambit appears in the novelization for X-Men: The Last Stand as one of several new students of Xavier's School for Gifted Youngsters trained by Wolverine.
 Remy LeBeau appears in the Adi Shankar's Bootleg Universe short film Truth In Journalism, portrayed by JC Tremblay. This version is a French film student in the midst of directing a documentary on disgraced investigative journalist Eddie Brock's encounters with Bullseye and the Venom symbiote.
 Gambit appears in Wolverine: The Lost Trail, voiced by Bill Heck.

References